The 1978 Seiko World Super Tennis, also known as the Tokyo Indoor, was a men's tennis tournament played on indoor carpet courts at the Tokyo Municipal Gym in Tokyo, Japan that was part of the 1978 Colgate-Palmolive Grand Prix. It was the inaugural edition of the tournament and was held from 31 October to 5 November 1978. Matches were the best of three sets. Second-seeded Björn Borg won the singles title and earned $30,000 first-prize money.

Finals

Singles

 Björn Borg defeated  Brian Teacher 6–3, 6–4
 It was Borg's 9th singles title of the year and the 39th of his career.

Doubles

 Ross Case /  Geoff Masters defeated  Pat DuPré /  Tom Gorman 6–3, 6–4

References

External links
 ITF tournament edition details

1978 Grand Prix (tennis)
1978 in Japanese tennis
1978